Shaq Vs. is an American reality television show produced for ABC by Dick Clark Productions and Media Rights Capital starring American basketball star Shaquille O'Neal. It began airing on August 18, 2009.

Shaquille O'Neal claims to be "the greatest athlete" and challenged numerous top athletes in their own sports.

The Washington Post has pointed out similarities to Shaq Vs. and Todd Gallagher's book Andy Roddick Beat Me with a Frying Pan saying the book and the show have "precisely the same premise" and that a TV show based on the book Gallagher was trying to sell was "the exact same show." TMZ later reported that Gallagher and O'Neal shared the same agent and the agent had previously shopped a virtually identical show with Gallagher. Gallagher's name appears in the credits of season 2 as a producer.

The Arizona Republic reported that in early 2008 Steve Nash, a former teammate of O'Neal's, had mentioned to O'Neal a reality show he was pursuing that would feature Nash taking on professional athletes in their own sport. O'Neal said Nash's idea was based on training with other athletes, not competing against them. Nash would not confirm the Republics story and said, "We collaborated on parts of the show." Nash is an executive producer of the program.

Mike Goldberg, former play-by-play announcer for the UFC, has served as both the show's play-by-play announcer and one of the show's two co-hosts for all of its seasons. In season 1, Pat Tomasulo, sports anchor at WGN-TV, co-hosted with Goldberg while Charissa Thompson served as the sideline reporter. In season 2, Kit Hoover served as both the co-host and sideline reporter.  Shaq's total record is 2 wins, 12 losses, and a tie.

The show did not return in 2011 for a third season.

Seasons

Season 1
Each episode in Season 1 included preliminary challenges, banter from news conferences, and O'Neal and his rival negotiating a handicap. In each episode Shaq and his competitor do some form of charity work. Shaq mentions quite often that he loves to see the smile on the little kids' faces. The laughs come from "trash talking," but "when it comes to competing, there is no joking," O'Neal says.Final Record: 0-5Season 2
In February 2010, ABC announced that the series will return for a second season. Season 2 would premiere on August 3, and unlike Season 1 which relied on sporting matches, Season 2 would also feature comedic non-sports competitions such as a spelling bee, dance battle, or magic act. Shaq competes against Dale Earnhardt Jr. in a NASCAR race, track and field sprinter Tyson Gay in a race, chef and television personality Rachael Ray in a cook-off, pop musician Justin Bieber in a dance-off, Charles Barkley in a golf match, Joey Chestnut in a hot dog eating contest, national spelling bee champion Kavya Shivashankar in a spell off, Las Vegas magic duo Penn & Teller by performing classic stage-magic acts, and Shane Mosley in a boxing match.Final Record: 2-7-1Overall Record: 2-12-1'

References

External links

2000s American reality television series
2009 American television series debuts
2010 American television series endings
American Broadcasting Company original programming
ABC Sports
Television series by Dick Clark Productions
2010s American reality television series
Television series by Media Rights Capital
Shaquille O'Neal